Éric Huchet (born 1 December 1962 in Saint-Germain-en-Laye) is a French contemporary lyric tenor.

Musical studies 
 University of Music and Performing Arts Vienna in Walter Berry's class

Roles 
 Achille, Menelas in Offenbach's La Belle Hélène, Théâtre du Châtelet, 2000, Marseille. 
 Le Prince Paul in Offenbach's La Grande-Duchesse de Gérolstein, Théâtre du Châtelet, 2004.
 Cochenille in Offenbach's The Tales of Hoffmann, Grand Théâtre de Genève, 2008.
 Falsacappa in Offenbach's Les Brigands, Opéra-Comique of Paris, 2011.
 Graf Elemer in Strauss's Arabella, Paris Opera, July 2012.
 Trufaldino in Sergei Prokofiev's The Love for Three Oranges, Paris Opera 2012
 Franz in Offenbach's The Tales of Hoffmann, Paris Opera, September 2012.
 Monostatos in Mozart's The Magic Flute, Angers-Nantes Opéra, May 2014.
 Spoletta in Puccini Tosca. Paris Opera, November 2014
 Cantarelli in Hérold's Le pré aux clercs. Opera-comique, Paris 2015

References

External links 
 Biography on the artist's website.
 Éric Huchet
 Éric Huchet: Le lyrique n’est pas en voie de disparition!
 Éric Huchet on Opera Online
 Éric Huchet on Olyrix.

1962 births
Living people
People from Saint-Germain-en-Laye
French operatic tenors